Jahaz Banda, also spelt Jaz Banda, is a large meadow in the upper reaches of Kumrat Valley, Upper Dir District of Khyber Pakhtunkhwa province of Pakistan. It is located at an altitude of 3,100 m above sea level. The region is surrounded by snow-clad mountains, towering trees, and covered by green pastures.

The main road continues north up the Upper Dir and reaches the village of Darwaza, where the road branches off and enters Lamoti village. It then ascends to Jandrai village by a jeepable unmetalled road; further on you have to trek to Jahaz Banda.

Gallery

See also
Kumrat Valley
Katora Lake
Ushirai Dara
Laram Top

References

Tourist attractions in Khyber Pakhtunkhwa
Tourism in Khyber Pakhtunkhwa
Upper Dir District